Valentine is the seventh album by English folk / rock singer-songwriter and guitarist Roy Harper. It was first released in 1974 by Harvest Records.

History

The album contains mainly love songs and was written whilst Harper was writing and recording his previous albums (Stormcock and Lifemask).

Promotional material at the time included full-page advertisements, in magazines such as ZigZag, of Harper wearing only a pair of socks and the words "music to droop your drawers to".

Tracks on compilation albums
A retrospective compilation album A Breath of Fresh Air – A Harvest Records Anthology 1969–1974, was released in 2007. This 3-disc compilation contains the album track "Twelve Hours Of Sunset".

Album cover

The album artwork has altered over the years according to the release label. The original release featured a carbon portrait of Harper erasing himself with a rubber. It was drawn by Joe Petagno whilst working for Hipgnosis The 1989 Awareness Records release featured a portrait of Harper by his then wife. In 1994, the Science Friction release reverted to a portrait of Harper, very similar to the original release, this time drawn by an old friend of Harper's, James Edgar. The most recent release reverts to the album's original Petagno drawn artwork.

Cover versions 

David Bedford, who orchestrated the album, composed a 35-minute choral suite, commissioned by the BBC, "Twelve Hours of Sunset", based on Harper's song of the same name, which was given its live premier at the Royal Albert Hall, London on 8 August 1975, by the BBC Singers, BBC Choral Society and BBC Symphony Orchestra, with Simon Lindley on organ, conducted by John Poole, as part of the 75th Proms. Another performance for BBC Radio was on 29 August 1997, on BBC Radio 3, by the Crouch End Festival Chorus and BBC Symphony Orchestra, with Jacques van Steen conducting, as part of a 60th birthday tribute to Bedford, who was also interviewed.

Track listing

Personnel 

Roy Harper – guitar and vocals
David Bedford – orchestral arrangements
Steve Broughton – percussion
Pete Sears – electric bass on "Forbidden Fruit" and "Acapulco Gold"
Mike Gibbs – brass arrangement on "Male Chauvinist Pig Blues"
Ronnie Lane – electric bass on "Male Chauvinist Pig Blues"
Keith Moon – percussion on "Male Chauvinist Pig Blues"
Jimmy Page – electric guitar on "Male Chauvinist Pig Blues"
Max Middleton – piano on "Acapulco Gold"
Marty Simon – percussion on "Acapulco Gold"
Tim Walker – guitar on "Che"
Ian Anderson – flute on "Home" (studio)
Technical
John Leckie – sound engineer

References

External links 
 Roy Harper official site
 Excellent Roy Harper resource

Roy Harper (singer) albums
1974 albums
Chrysalis Records albums
Harvest Records albums
Albums with cover art by Hipgnosis
Albums with cover art by Joe Petagno
Albums produced by Peter Jenner